Henry Charles Taylor (16 December 1932 – 24 October 2013) was a British racing driver from England.

Racing career
Born in Shefford, Bedfordshire, Taylor started his career in speedway in East London before switching to a 500cc Formula Three Cooper in 1954, quickly demonstrating his talent. He won two Formula Three championships in 1955, and repeated the achievement in 1956, taking 15 wins. He drove in sports car racing as well, winning in a Jaguar D-Type. Continuing his winning ways in Formula Two in 1958, while scoring several good placings in the UK and in France, he soon graduated to Grand Prix racing.

He participated in 11 Formula One World Championship Grands Prix, scoring three championship points, with his best result at the 1960 French Grand Prix, a fourth place in his Cooper T51. That year he also drove for Ken Tyrrell's Formula Junior team, winning twice. He found less success in the following season's World Championship Grands Prix, but finished second twice in domestic Formula One races, among other strong results. Not long after a serious accident in the 1961 British Grand Prix, Taylor turned away from single-seater racing and took up rallying, taking part in the Monte Carlo Rally.

For the following four seasons, Taylor rallied a Ford Anglia, drove the Ford Cortina on its rally debut, and also campaigned the highly successful Lotus Cortina, which he also raced in the European Touring Car Championship in 1964. He achieved a number of top six placings in rallies with all three cars, and took two second places in ETCC races.

After retiring from rallying in 1965, he became Ford's Competition Manager. He also drove for the British Olympic bobsleigh team.

Death
Taylor died on 24 October 2013 in Vallauris, France after a long battle with ill health.

Racing record

Complete Formula One World Championship results
(key)

Complete British Saloon Car Championship results
(key) (Races in bold indicate pole position; races in italics indicate fastest lap.)

References

External links
Henry Taylor profile at The 500 Owners Association

1932 births
2013 deaths
English Formula One drivers
Reg Parnell Racing Formula One drivers
British Racing Partnership Formula One drivers
British Formula Three Championship drivers
24 Hours of Le Mans drivers
People from Shefford, Bedfordshire
World Sportscar Championship drivers